Sami Pietilä (born 20 March 1975) is a Finnish cross-country skier. He represented Finland at the 2002 Winter Olympics in Salt Lake City, where he competed in the 30 km and the 50 km.

Cross-country skiing results
All results are sourced from the International Ski Federation (FIS).

Olympic Games

World Cup

Season standings

References

External links

1975 births
Living people
Finnish male cross-country skiers
Cross-country skiers at the 2002 Winter Olympics
Olympic cross-country skiers of Finland
People from Valkeakoski
Sportspeople from Pirkanmaa
21st-century Finnish people